Janel Holcomb (born December 2, 1978) is an American racing cyclist. She competed in the 2013 UCI women's team time trial in Florence.

References

External links
 

1978 births
Living people
American female cyclists
Cyclists from California
Sportspeople from San Diego
21st-century American women